WZXX (88.5 FM) is a radio station broadcasting a Christian radio format. Licensed to Lawrenceburg, Tennessee, United States, the station is currently owned by Radio by Grace, Inc.

Translators

References

External links
 
 

ZXX
Lawrence County, Tennessee
Radio stations established in 1975